Erika Santos Silva, known as Erika Hilton (born 9 December 1992) is a Brazilian politician and activist for black and LGBT rights. Hilton studied teaching and gerontology before entering politics.

Affiliated to the Socialism and Liberty Party (PSOL), in the 2020 elections, she gained national and international notice by becoming the first openly transgender councilor elected to the Municipal Chamber of São Paulo, receiving the most votes for any councilor in the country.

In November 2021, she was honoured with a "Generation Change Award" at the 2021 MTV Europe Music Awards in Budapest.

In 2022 she and Duda Salabert became the first two openly transgender people elected to the National Congress of Brazil, with both of them elected to its Chamber of Deputies. Hilton was honored as one of the BBC 100 Women in December 2022.

References 

1992 births
Living people
Brazilian feminists
Brazilian politicians of African descent
Brazilian LGBT rights activists
Brazilian LGBT politicians
Transgender women
Transgender politicians 
Afro-Brazilian feminists
Brazilian women in politics
Travestis
São Paulo (state) politicians
BBC 100 Women
21st-century Brazilian women politicians
Members of the Chamber of Deputies (Brazil)
Brazilian transgender people